Acacia concolorans is a shrub belonging to the genus Acacia and the subgenus Phyllodineae that is endemic to Western Australia.

Description
It blooms from July to August and produces yellow flowers. The rudimentary inflorescences occur in groups of two per raceme, the small spherical flower-heads contain seven to eight golden flowers.

Taxonomy
The species was first formally described by the botanist Bruce Maslin in 1999 as part of the work Acacia miscellany 16. The taxonomy of fifty-five species of Acacia, primarily Western Australian, in section Phyllodineae (Leguminosae: Mimosoideae) as published in the journal Nuytsia. It was reclassified as Racosperma concolorans by Leslie Pedley in 2003 and transferred back to the genus Acacia in 2006. It is closely related to Acacia inamabilis which has larger phyllodes and larger flower-heads containing many more flowers.

Distribution
It is native to an area of the Wheatbelt and the Goldfields-Esperance regions of Western Australia between Kondinin and Yilgarn where it is found on lateritic flats and hills growing in red to brown loam-clay soils as a part of open Eucalyptus woodland or mallee shrubland communities.

See also
List of Acacia species

References

concolorans
Acacias of Western Australia
Plants described in 1999
Taxa named by Bruce Maslin